The Frustrated Artist Tour was a club and theater tour by American R&B singer Erykah Badu. During the summer of 2002, Badu at the time was getting writer's block from penning songs for her album Worldwide Underground. Hoping to find inspiration, she set out on a 2-month trek of theaters and small clubs, with additional dates added through the summer until December. During this tour, Erykah had the chance to showcase new songs from the album, "Danger", "I Want You", "Woo" and "Back in the Day (Puff)". A new song "Dear Misery" was performed well as hits.

Badu's show featured a DJ, laser lights, and audience participation as Erykah would perform songs requested from the audience. Badu would often stage dive into the audience, and singer Zap Mama would appear on select dates as a featured guest.

Opening act
Common (USA—Leg, select dates)
Cody Chesnutt (USA—Leg)

Set list
 "Badu Show" (Intro)
 "Bump It"
 "No Love"1
 "Certainly"
 "Back in the Day (Puff)"1
 "Otherside of the Game"
 "Danger"
 Medley: "On & On"/"...& On"
 "Woo"
 "Appletree"
 "Penitentiary Philosophy"
 "I Want You"
 "Baby I'm Scared of You"1
 "Cleva"
 "Dear Misery" (New song)
 "Do You Wanna' Go to Hell?" (with Cody Chesnutt) (New song)
 "Kiss Me on My Neck" (contains excerpts of "My Neck, My Back (Lick It)"
 "Didn't Cha Know?"
 "Time's a Wastin'"1
 "Ye Yo" 1
 "Next Lifetime"
 "Orange Moon"1
 "Green Eyes"
 "Love of My Life (An Ode to Hip-Hop)" (contains excerpts of "La Di Da Di" and "Rapper's Delight")
 "Bag Lady"

1performed only on selected dates in North America2performed on dates in Europe

Notes

Badu's boyfriend at that time was hip hop artist Common. On select dates for the performance of their number one R&B hit, "Love of My Life (Hip-Hop)", Common joined Erykah on stage, both performers delivering a rousing ovation of the song.
Opening act Cody Chesnutt joined in for her performance of "Do You Want To Go To Hell" on selected dates during the tour.
For her concert on June 30, in Chicago at the Petrillo Band Shell, R&B singer Syleena Johnson was featured as opening act before the show.

Tour dates

Notes
 The tour resumed that summer through December, not all tour dates listed.

References

Erykah Badu concert tours
2003 concert tours